Woodend may refer to:

Australia 
 Woodend, Victoria
 Woodend, Queensland
 Woodend, New South Wales

New Zealand 
 Woodend, New Zealand

United Kingdom

England
 Woodend, Egremont, Cumbria
 Woodend, Ulpha, Cumbria
 Woodend, Northamptonshire

Scotland
 Woodend, Aberdeen, a western suburb of Aberdeen, location of Woodend Hospital

United States 
 Woodend (Chevy Chase, Maryland)

See also
Wood End (disambiguation)